Graduate House can refer to:
University of Toronto Graduate House
Graduate House (University of Melbourne)
Graduate House (Australian National University)